William Cowles may refer to:

 William H. H. Cowles (1840–1901), U.S. politician
 William S. Cowles (1846–1923), U.S. admiral
 William H. Cowles, publisher

See also
Billy Cowell, footballer